Sea lines of communication (abbreviated as SLOC) is a term describing the primary maritime routes between ports, used for trade, logistics and naval forces. It is generally used in reference to naval operations to ensure that SLOCs are open, or in times of war, to close them. 
The importance of SLOCs in geopolitics was described in Nicholas J. Spykman's America's Strategy in World Politics published in 1942.

In the American Revolutionary War and the Napoleonic Wars, the SLOCs were, for the most part, in the control of the British Navy. When the British lost control of them during the Revolution, the result was the fall of Yorktown and its biggest army and, ultimately, the war. In the Napoleonic era, maintaining belligerence throughout, the British embargoed and blockaded any country associated with Napoleon, which created large economic hardships and dislocations that played a part in people of France becoming disenchanted with Napoleon.

In World War I and World War II, the British and Germans declared mutual blockade and the Kriegsmarine attempted to close the SLOCs from North America to the British Isles with the use of submarines. In each case the Allies succeeded in keeping the sea lanes open. The Germans in each case failed to defeat the British naval blockade of Germany. The United States Navy in World War II successfully closed the SLOCs to Japan, strangling the resource-poor island nation.

Had the Cold War turned hot, Europe would have required resupply and reinforcement from North America. The Soviet Navy could potentially threaten and contest Atlantic SLOCs to support ground offensives in Europe.

See also
Choke point
Line of communication
String of Pearls (Indian Ocean)

References

Further reading 

 
 
 
 
 
 
 
 
 
 
 
 
 

Military strategy
Naval warfare
International security
Military geography
Military logistics
Maritime history